Diana Mary "Dido" Harding, Baroness Harding of Winscombe (born 9 November 1967), is a British businesswoman and Conservative life peer. She served as chairwoman of NHS Improvement from 2017, and from May 2020 to April 2021, during the COVID-19 pandemic, she was the head of the NHS Test and Trace programme.

She is a former chief executive of the TalkTalk Group where she faced calls for her to resign after a cyber attack revealed the details of up to four million customers; the company was subsequently fined £400,000 by the Information Commissioner's Office for its negligence. A member of the Conservative Party, Harding is married to Conservative Party Member of Parliament John Penrose and is a friend of former Prime Minister David Cameron. Harding was appointed as a Member of the House of Lords by Cameron in 2014. She holds a board position at the Jockey Club, which is responsible for several major horse-racing events including the Cheltenham Festival.

In May 2020, Harding was appointed by Health Secretary Matt Hancock to head NHS Test and Trace, established to track and help prevent the spread of COVID-19 in England. In August 2020, after it was announced Public Health England was to be abolished, Harding was also appointed interim chief executive of the new National Institute for Health Protection, later renamed the UK Health Security Agency. Both these roles ended on the formal establishment of the new agency on 1 April 2021. In June 2021, Harding temporarily stood aside as NHS Improvement Chair to apply, unsuccessfully, for the position of Chief Executive of NHS England.

Early life
Harding is the daughter of John Harding, 2nd Baron Harding of Petherton, and the granddaughter of Field Marshal John Harding, 1st Baron Harding of Petherton, who commanded the Desert Rats for a few months in World War II.

Raised on the family pig farm in Dorset, she was educated from 1978 to 1985 at St Antony's Leweston, then an all-girl private Catholic school. She then graduated in Philosophy, Politics and Economics, from Magdalen College, Oxford, where she studied under Vernon Bogdanor and alongside David Cameron, and then studied at Harvard Business School, gaining an MBA.

Career
Upon graduating in 1988 she joined the management consultancy McKinsey & Company. In 1995 she was appointed marketing director of Thomas Cook before moving to Manpower and Kingfisher in 1998 and Woolworths in 1999. From 2000 to 2004 she was “commercial director for value added foods" and then “international support director” at Tesco. In 2007 she moved to Sainsbury's as convenience store director, and took a seat on the operating board in 2008.
She was named the first CEO of TalkTalk in 2010, when Carphone Warehouse split its telecoms business from its retail operation. She was appointed as a non-executive director on The Court of The Bank of England in July 2014. She has also served on the boards of British Land and Cheltenham Racecourse.

In October 2015, TalkTalk experienced a cyber-attack, during which personal and banking details of up to four million customers, not all of which were encrypted, were thought to have been accessed. City A.M. described her responses as "naive", noting that early on, when asked if the affected customer data was encrypted or not, she replied: "The awful truth is that I don't know". Her inflexible line on termination fees was also criticised. Marketing ran a headline, "TalkTalk boss Dido Harding's utter ignorance is a lesson to us all". The Evening Standard noted that "It has been a tough week for TalkTalk boss Dido Harding, facing complaints from customers and calls for her head". The company admitted the incident had cost it £60 million and lost it 95,000 customers. Fining the company £400,000, the Information Commissioner Elizabeth Denham blamed a "failure to implement the most basic cyber security measures."

In February 2017, Harding announced that she would stand down as CEO of TalkTalk in order to focus more on her public service activities. In January 2018 she joined the main board of the Jockey Club, which runs many of British horse racing's most popular events, including the Grand National, the Cheltenham Festival and the Derby.

Political service
Harding joined the House of Lords as a Conservative life peer on 20 October 2014. She has sat on the Economic Affairs Committee since 27 June 2017. She has not rebelled against her party on any of the votes she has attended during her time in the House.

Public service and controversies
In October 2017, Harding was appointed chair of NHS Improvement, which is responsible for overseeing all NHS hospitals, comprising foundation trusts and NHS trusts, as well as independent providers of NHS-funded care. Parliament's Health Select Committee, at that time chaired by former Conservative MP Sarah Wollaston, recommended that Harding resign as a Conservative peer and sit as a crossbench peer in order to "allow for greater parliamentary and public confidence in her ability to challenge government ministers and policies if this role demands it". Harding did not accept this. Her role ceased in July 2022, when NHS Improvement was merged into NHS England.

In May 2020, Health Secretary Matt Hancock announced that Harding was to be put in charge of the "track, test and trace" programme (later given the name NHS Test and Trace) as part of the UK government's response to the COVID-19 pandemic. In November 2020, a case was lodged jointly by the not-for-profit Good Law Project and the Runnymede Trust, a race equality think tank, to challenge the legality of this appointment. In February 2022, two High Court judges ruled that Hancock had failed to comply with the Equality Act 2010 when appointing Harding, and also when appointing Mike Coupe as director of testing in September 2020. The court was told that Harding intervened to add Coupe, a former colleague of hers at Sainsbury's, to the shortlist of candidates.

On 18 June 2020 it was announced by Hancock that the UK government intended to switch its contact-recording mobile phone app from a centralised model to the decentralised approach pioneered by Apple and Google, due to privacy concerns, among other things. Harding was to decide on the suitability of the alternative model. She stated that "what we've done in really rigorously testing both our own COVID-19 app and the Google-Apple version is demonstrate that none of them are working sufficiently well to be actually reliable to determine whether any of us should self-isolate for two weeks [and] that's true across the world". The change was, however, widely interpreted in the press as an abandonment of the UK's app in favour of the Apple-Google one, and a U-turn by the government. The BBC also reported that the "latest developments come a day after the BBC revealed that a former Apple executive, Simon Thompson, was taking charge of the late-running project as part of Baroness Harding's team".

In August 2020 the government announced a merger between Public Health England and NHS Test and Trace to form the National Institute for Health Protection, with Harding as interim chief executive. The appointment was criticised by health experts as she did not have a background in health, and because of her political position. The Guardian quoted allies of hers who, in response, said that she had quickly learned after being appointed chair of NHS Improvement in 2017 and that she had a record of "getting things done" while working in business. It has been widely claimed that her appointments to various public bodies came about through nepotism and her alliances with members of the Conservative party and key figures in the political establishment. Jolyon Maugham QC, director of the Good Law Project, wrote: "For ministers or special advisers to choose their friends or close associates for these key roles is to exclude those who are more able, or better value. And ultimately it is the public interest that suffers." In 2022 the Runnymede Trust won a High Court action that Matt Hancock had failed to comply with public sector equality duty when appointing Harding to head the National Institute for Health Protection.

As the second spike of the pandemic developed into the winter of 2020 and over Christmas, commentary developed in much of the press about Harding's absence from the national stage as hospitalisations and deaths grew alarmingly. The columnist Rod Liddle in the right-leaning The Sunday Times complained: "Test and Trace has cost the taxpayer £22bn. It has repeatedly failed to achieve targets it has been set. It was once heralded as The Thing That Would Defeat Covid, but nobody talks about it much any more."

In January 2021, Harding defended spending upwards of £1,000-a-day each on consultants for the contact tracing programme. Appearing before the Public Accounts Committee, Harding told MPs she felt it was "appropriate" to bring in external help in "extreme emergency circumstances".

In June 2021, Harding took a temporary leave of absence from her role as chair of NHS Improvement to apply unsuccessfully for the position of Chief Executive of NHS England, with Sir Andrew Valentine Morris acting in the interim.

Honours and awards
In February 2013, she was included in that year's list of the hundred most powerful women in the UK by Woman's Hour on BBC Radio 4. The following year, she was named in the ten most influential women in the BBC Woman's Hour Power List 2014.

Harding was created a life peer on 15 September 2014, taking the title Baroness Harding of Winscombe in the county of Somerset.

Harding is an Honorary Doctor of Business Administration at Anglia Ruskin University.

Personal life
In October 1995, she married John Penrose, who was elected MP for Weston-super-Mare in 2005 and went on to hold junior minister posts from 2010 to 2019. The couple met while working at McKinsey, have two daughters, and live in London during the week and Somerset at the weekend. Penrose sits on the advisory board of a think tank called 1828, which calls for the NHS to be replaced by an insurance system and for Public Health England to be scrapped.

Harding is a horse racing enthusiast and member of the Jockey Club, joining the main board in January 2018. In 1993 she borrowed £7,000 from her bank to buy an Irish thoroughbred to ride in ladies' point-to-point races. In 1998, her horse Cool Dawn won the Cheltenham Gold Cup. Harding rode Cool Dawn herself for three seasons, achieving second place in the 1996 Foxhunter Chase at Cheltenham. She said that the horse: "... taught me that dreams come true, sometimes, that actually miracles can happen. Isn't that a great gift? I think it shaped my business career ...".

Books
. Harding's memoir.

Arms

References

1967 births
Living people
20th-century English businesspeople
20th-century English businesswomen
21st-century English businesspeople
21st-century English businesswomen
20th-century English memoirists
20th-century English women writers
Writers from Dorset
Alumni of Magdalen College, Oxford
Harvard Business School alumni
Sainsbury's people
TalkTalk Group people
British racehorse owners and breeders
Life peeresses created by Elizabeth II
Daughters of barons
Conservative Party (UK) life peers
McKinsey & Company people
John Harding family
English jockeys
Harding
British women memoirists